Hybrid low may refer to a number of different meteorological depressions:
Kona storm, seasonal cyclone in the Hawaiian Islands
Mediterranean tropical-like cyclone, rare meteorological phenomena observed in the Mediterranean Sea
Nor'easter, a synoptic-scale cyclone
Polar low, a small-scale, short-lived depression over certain ocean areas
Subtropical cyclone, a weather system that has some characteristics of a tropical and an extratropical cyclone
Superstorm, a large, destructive storm without another distinct meteorological classification

Examples 
1991 Perfect Storm, a nor'easter that absorbed Hurricane Grace
1996 Lake Huron cyclone, a strong cyclonic storm system over Lake Huron
Hurricane Catarina, an extremely rare South Atlantic tropical cyclone
2006 Central Pacific cyclone, an unusual low pressure system that formed in 2006
Tropical Storm Haiyan (2007), It developed from a tropical low that formed northeast of Wake Island
Tropical Storm Omeka, Central Pacific storm that formed from a Kona storm
Hurricane Sandy, destructive Atlantic hurricane that combined with a cold front to undergo an Extra-tropical transition just before landfall.
Hurricane Alex (2016), Atlantic hurricane in January, a rarity
Subtropical Storm 96C, A subtropical cyclone that formed from the remnants of Hurricane Lane (2018).

See also 
Cyclogenesis
Kármán vortex street
South Atlantic tropical cyclone
Tropical cyclone
Tropical cyclogenesis

Types of cyclone